KSAO-LD (channel 49) is a low-power television station in Sacramento, California, United States, affiliated with the 24/7 headline news service NewsNet. It is owned by Cocola Broadcasting. KSAO-LD's transmitter is located on Crescent Hill in El Dorado Hills.

Technical information

Subchannels
The station's digital channel is multiplexed:

Most of KSAO's subchannels are not available on local cable and satellite providers, although the national feed of Shop LC is carried by some local providers.

In 2019, KSAO became the third station in the Sacramento television market to affiliate with This TV on digital subchannel 49.2, after having previous subchannel affiliations with KQCA (subchannel 58.2) and KTXL (subchannel 40.3).

Former subchannel affiliations
KSAO affiliated with MundoMax when the network launched (as MundoFox) in August 2012. It was also affiliated with Bounce TV on digital subchannel 49.2 until March 2013, when Bounce was switched over to KUVS-DT digital subchannel 19.3 as part of a distribution agreement with Univision Communications (now TelevisaUnivision), owner of KUVS.

KSAO was affiliated with TheCoolTV on digital subchannel 49.2 until April 2016 when it was dropped and replaced by Retro TV. As part of an affiliation deal with Retro TV's parent company Luken Communications, it also included the addition of Rev'n on digital subchannel 49.5. Both channels were dropped in 2018.

A simulcast of former Azteca América affiliate KSTV-LP, channel 32, aired on digital subchannel 49.3 until the simulcast was dropped in early 2016. The channel remained silent for a short time until May 11, 2016, when it was affiliated with Buzzr, a broadcast television network airing classic game shows.

Azteca América returned to KSAO on its main channel as the primary Sacramento area affiliate when MundoMax ceased operations on November 30, 2016. On December 31, 2022, the network ceased operations and the station affiliated with NewsNet the next day on January 1, 2023. When KSAO was affiliated with Azteca América, its main channel was not carried by DirecTV and instead carried Azteca América owned-and-operated KEMO-TV (subchannel 50.2) in the San Francisco Bay Area due to KEMO’s high-definition signal.

References

External links
Cocola Broadcasting

SAO-LD
Low-power television stations in the United States
Television channels and stations established in 1989
NewsNet affiliates
Buzzr affiliates
This TV affiliates
SAO-LD